The Battle of Pollocks Crossing is the sixth novel by J.L. Carr, published in 1985. The novel was shortlisted for the Booker Prize in 1985 and followed a nomination in 1980 for A Month in the Country, his preceding novel.

The novel describes a year spent by a young English exchange teacher named George Gidner in the fictional town of Palisades on the Great Plains of  South Dakota in the months leading up to the Wall Street Crash. Like many of Carr's novels it is grounded in personal experience: Carr worked for a year as an exchange teacher in Huron, South Dakota in 1938–1939 and returned again to teach in 1956–1957. Carr also reported that it was his first novel, but the book failed initially to find a publisher. When it had been accepted by Viking Penguin, Carr took it back and spent two days rewriting it. The early titles of the novel were apparently Oh, My America, a quotation from John Donne and To the West, To the West, an immigrant song, although Carr may not have been entirely serious. When the novel was published Carr issued a small 16-page companion volume called Gidner's Brief Lives of the Frontier, a dictionary of people who had lived and died between 1810 and 1890 to the east of the Mississippi river.

Carr bought back the rights to the novel and published it in 1993 in an edition of 2,000 copies as the fourth title from his Quince Tree Press, who still publish it.

Publishing history
 1985  Viking Penguin, 
 1986  Penguin Books, 
 1993  The Quince Tree Press,

Translations

 1987 De slag bij Pollocks Crossing, Veen, Utrecht, Netherlands, 
 1991 La bataille de Pollocks Crossing, Actes Sud, France. Translated by Pierre Girard.

References

1985 British novels
English novels
Novels by J. L. Carr
Novels set in South Dakota
Viking Press books
Fiction set in 1929